This is a list of the government cabinets of Greece.

External links
 General Secretariat of the Government - List of Greek governments since 1909

 
Greece politics-related lists
Greece